Granulinopsis is a genus of minute sea snails, marine gastropod mollusks or micromollusks in the family Granulinidae.

Species
 Granulinopsis atlantidea (Boyer, 2016)
 Granulinopsis cylindrata (Boyer & Rolán, 2004)
 Granulinopsis zanclea (Bogi, Boyer, Renda & Giacobbe, 2016)

References

 Boyer F. (2017). Révision de l'organisation supra-spécifique des gastéropodes granuliniformes. Xenophora Taxonomy. 16: 25-38

Granulinidae